"2055" is a song by American rapper Sleepy Hallow, released on April 14, 2021 as the second single from his debut studio album Still Sleep? (2021). Produced by Great John and UV Killin Em, it is his highest-charting song, peaking at number 51 on the Billboard Hot 100. The official remix of the song was released on July 28, 2021, and features American rapper Coi Leray.

Composition
In the song, Sleepy Hallow uses a melodic delivery over a beat of guitar and drums with a melancholy tone and lyrics about his loneliness: "I just wanna slide, huh / Parties in the sky like it's 2055, huh / She said 'Boy you nice, boy you nice', huh / Heart cold like some water and some ice (Huh)". He sings about mistrust and struggles in his street life as well ("Real niggas cry blood (Blood) / Hope my kid never try drugs (Huh) / All I wanted was some love, would that trade for a gun (Huh) / Big pack on me now, remember back then I was fucked up, huh / I don't really want friends, everybody fake, I don't got trust").

Music video
A music video was released alongside the single. The animated visual was directed by Ryan Dylan Selkirk (Aylo) and animation was designed by Owen Khang, Akam Hussein Rustam and Melis Sosa. It features Sleepy Hallow visiting an alternate world with a futuristic city setting. He stops at a party where he meets a bartender who’s "not exactly what she seems to be at first", and rides around the city in a "high-tech car". It has over 70 million views on YouTube.

Live performances
On July 13, 2021, Sleepy Hallow performed the song on the Open Mic of Genius.

Remix
A remix featuring American rapper Coi Leray was released on July 28, 2021. Trent Clark of HipHopDX described Leray's feature as "patented, rapid-fire spills" that does not "belabor the song length". The remix also comes with an animated visualizer that finds the collaborators "outside on a cold and rainy night."

Charts

Weekly charts

Year-end charts

Certifications

References

2021 singles
2021 songs
Sleepy Hallow songs
RCA Records singles
Songs written by Sleepy Hallow
Animated music videos